Ferrari is an Italian company which has produced sports cars since 1947, but traces its roots back to 1929 when Enzo Ferrari formed the Scuderia Ferrari racing team.

In January 2016, Ferrari officially split off from its former parent company Fiat Chrysler Automobiles.

1929–1937 – Scuderia Ferrari
Enzo Ferrari was not initially interested in the idea of producing road cars when he formed Scuderia Ferrari in 1929, with headquarters in Modena. The Scuderia bought, prepared and fielded racing cars for gentleman drivers. It rapidly became a technical-racing outpost of Alfa Romeo and effectively took over as its official racing department in 1933 when Alfa Romeo withdrew its in-house racing team.

The Scuderia was then supplied with Alfa Romeo P3 monopostos (open-wheel car) and fielded many famous drivers such as Tazio Nuvolari and Achille Varzi. Ferrari's monopostos were now sporting the Prancing Horse shield on the engine cover. In 1935 Ferrari's workshop designed and built its first race car, the Alfa Romeo Bimotore, taking the first steps on the route to become a car manufacturer. Moreover, in 1937 the first examples of Alfetta 158 were assembled in Modena under Enzo Ferrari's supervision. In 1938 Alfa Romeo brought its racing operation again in-house, forming Alfa Corse in Milan and hired Enzo Ferrari as manager of the new racing department. At the same time, the Scuderia Ferrari was disbanded.

1939–1946 – Auto Avio Costruzioni
On 6 September 1939, Enzo Ferrari left Alfa Romeo under the provision that he would not use the Ferrari name in association with races or racing cars for at least four years. A few days later he founded Auto Avio Costruzioni, headquartered in the facilities of the old Scuderia Ferrari in Modena. The new company ostensibly produced machine tools and aircraft parts but in 1940 Ferrari did in fact build two examples of a race car – the Auto Avio Costruzioni 815, based on a Fiat 508C platform. It was the first Ferrari car and debuted at the 1940 Mille Miglia, but due to World War II it saw little competition. In 1943 the Ferrari factory moved to Maranello, where it has remained ever since. During the war the company's focus was mostly on fabricating grinding machines which were copies of original German tooling machines. The factory was bombed by the Allies between 1944 and 1945, but it was quickly rebuilt. In late 1945, after the war ended, Ferrari commissioned Gioacchino Colombo the design of a new V12 engine. In December 1946 Ferrari released to the press the specifications and drawings of his new car.

1947–1961 – The beginning
The first Ferrari-badged car was the 1947 125 Sport, powered by a 1.5 L V12 engine. On March 12, Enzo Ferrari took the car out for its first test-drive on the open roads. Two examples debuted on 11 May 1947 at the Piacenza racing circuit, driven by Franco Cortese and Nino Farina. This was the first time a Ferrari-badged car was entered in a race.

In 1950, Ferrari fielded racing cars in the Monaco Grand Prix, the first World Championship event held there. José Froilán González won the first Grand Prix for Ferrari in 1951, and Alberto Ascari secured Ferrari's first World Drivers' Champions title in 1952, a task he would repeat the following season. In 1957 the company changed its name to Auto Costruzioni Ferrari. The same year, the Dino marque was introduced.

1961 – The great walkout

Enzo Ferrari's strong personality had served his company and racing team, Scuderia Ferrari, well for decades. Internal tensions reached boiling point in November 1961. Long-time sales manager Girolamo Gardini had long chafed at the involvement of Enzo's wife, Laura, in the company. The two frequently argued, and their dispute became a crisis for the company when Gardini, together with manager Romolo Tavoni, chief engineer Carlo Chiti, experimental sports car development chief Giotto Bizzarrini, made an ultimatum to Ferrari, demanding the removal of his wife from the company in a letter.

As a result, Ferrari called a meeting where Gardini, Tavoni, Chiti, Bizzarrini and a number of others who stood by them were ousted. All were tremendous losses to the company, and many thought this might be the end of Ferrari. Indeed, the defectors immediately formed a new company, ATS, to directly compete with Ferrari on the street and the track, and took with them Scuderia Serenissima, one of Ferrari's best racing customers.

This "great walkout" came at an especially difficult time for Ferrari. At the urging of Chiti, the company was developing a new 250-based model to defend its honor against the Jaguar E-Type. Development of this car, the 250 GTO, was at a critical point, with the chassis development and styling left incomplete. Even if the car could be finished, it was unclear if it could be raced successfully without Tavoni and his lieutenants.

Into this void stepped young engineer Mauro Forghieri and long-time racing bodyman Sergio Scaglietti, founder of Carrozzeria Scaglietti. Forghieri successfully honed the GTO's handling and Scaglietti designed an all-new body for the car. The GTO went to the 1962 12 Hours of Sebring with drivers Phil Hill and Olivier Gendebien. They placed first in class and were second overall behind the Ferrari 250 Testa Rossa.  It continued winning through 1962, brushing aside the challenge from Jaguar and becoming one of the most famous sports cars in history.

This shakeup, and Forghieri's engineering talent, made the 1960s even more successful for Ferrari than the previous decade. The mid-engined Dino racers laid the foundation for Forghieri's dominant 250-powered 250 P. On the street, the Dino road cars sold strongly, and legendary models like the 275 and Daytona were on the way.

1963–1967 – The United States rivals
The big V8-powered AC Cobra (Shelby Cobra) challenged the Ferraris in the early 1960s. By 1963, Ford tried to buy Ferrari but no agreement was reached. Instead, the Ford GT40 ended the dominance of Ferrari P (the P standing for prototype) at the 24 Hours of Le Mans in 1966 when GT-40 Mark IIs finished 1-2-3. Ford dominated Le Mans again in 1967 in the Mark IV.

1968 – Ferrari boycott
After the performance of the big V8-powered Ford at the 1967 Le Mans, the Fédération Internationale de l'Automobile (FIA) banned prototypes over 3000cc, which also affected the 330Ps. The change was announced in late 1967 and came in effect for 1968; for that season, the Scuderia did not take part in sports car racing in protest.

1969–1971 – The challenge with Porsche 
These years saw a new challenger. Formerly competing with smaller cars only, the Germans entered the new 3-litre sports car prototype class in 1968 with the Porsche 908, while Ferrari raced the Ferrari 312 P in only few events in 1969. In March, the presentation of the 5 litre Porsche 917, built in advance in 25 exemplars, had surprised also Ferrari, which answered later that year with the production of 25 Ferrari 512S, funded from the money gained by the Fiat deal. At that time, Porsche had almost a full season of experience with their new car, and took the World Sportscar Championship where Ferrari was only 4th.

The 1970 season saw epic battles between the two teams and the many cars they entered, yet Porsche won every event except Sebring, where the victorious car and its drivers Ignazio Giunti / Nino Vaccarella / Mario Andretti had their origins in Italy. Ferrari decided to give up the 512 in 1971 in order to prepare the new 312 PB for the 1972 season, when only 3 litre class would be allowed. In addition to Porsche, the old national rival with its Alfa Romeo T33/3 also had won two races in 1971, and thus was ranked second in the World Championship, above Ferrari.

1969 – Fiat
Early in 1969, Fiat S.p.A. took a 50% stake in Ferrari. An immediate result was an increase in available investment funds, and work started at once on a factory extension intended to transfer production from Fiat's Turin plant of the Ferrari engined Fiat Dino.  New model investment further up in the Ferrari range also received a boost.

Less positive was the effect on industrial relations at Ferrari's Maranello plant.  In June a visiting journalist witnessed a group of workers suddenly running out of a workshop in response to the blast of a whistle: this was part of an industrial stoppage originating at the main Fiat plant in Turin, and contrasted with the relatively smooth state of production that the writer had witnessed at nearby competitor plants run by Maserati, De Tomaso, and Lamborghini.

While increased Fiat influence was quickly felt in the development, production and marketing of road cars, the racing department remained initially little touched by Fiat's new status within the company as chief investor.

1972–1973 – dominance, defeats and fare-well
The 312 PB dominated the World Sportscar Championship in 1972 against a rival Alfa Romeo, as the Porsche factory did not compete after the rule changes, and Matra, as Equipe Matra Sports, focused on Le Mans only. In their home race, the French won, as Ferrari did not enter in 1972 due insufficient reliability over 24 hours, in order not to blemish their otherwise perfect record in that season.

In 1973, though, the Matra team also challenged for the championship which Ferrari eventually lost with two wins, compared to Matra's five, while Alfa Romeo had not entered that year. In addition, Ferrari was now forced to race also at Le Mans, despite concerns that even the modified engine would not last. Yet, one car survived and scored an unexpected and honourable 2nd place.

Ferrari then retired from sports car racing to focus on the ailing Formula One effort.

1974–1987 – Niki Lauda and the 1980s
Ferrari enjoyed a successful spell in Formula One in the 1970s, with Niki Lauda winning the World Championship in 1975 and 1977, and Jody Scheckter in 1979. In the 1980s, however, the team entered a period of crisis, culminating with the death of Gilles Villeneuve in Belgium in 1982 and a nearly-fatal accident for Didier Pironi in Germany the very same year.

1988 – The death of Enzo
Enzo Ferrari died in 1988, at the age of 90. The last new model he commissioned was the specialist F40. Fiat increased its stake in Ferrari to 90% after buying the shares of its founder. Former Sporting Director Luca Cordero di Montezemolo was appointed President in 1991.

1996 – champion Schumacher to Scuderia Ferrari
The hiring of Jean Todt as sporting director in 1993 and Michael Schumacher in 1996 triggered a comeback of the F1 team, with three wins in 1996, and close yet eventually losing challenges to the driver's championship in the years 1997 to 1999.

2000–2004 – Schumacher dominates Formula One
In an unprecedented and record-setting fashion, Schumacher and Ferrari dominated Formula One, winning the World Driver's championship from 2000 through 2004 and the Constructors' Championship from 1999 through 2004.

2002–2010 – new shareholders
In June 2002, Fiat sold 34% of Ferrari to a Mediobanca-led consortium of banks for €775.2 million. The consortium comprised Commerzbank (who got a 10% stake for €228 million), Banca Popolare dell'Emilia Romagna (BPER Banca) (1.5%) and Compagnie Monégasque de Banque (CMB Monaco) (1%). Mediobanca retained a 21.5% stake.

In July 2005, Mediobanca sold 5% of Ferrari to Mubadala Development Company (now Mubadala Investment Company), an investment company wholly owned by the Government of Abu Dhabi. The deal saw Mubadala pay €114 million to purchase the five percent stake.

In October 2006, Fiat bought back the 29% stake still owned by the consortium, paying €892 million. At the time of the transaction, Mediobanca owned an 11.7% stake, Commerzbank the 8.5%, ABN AMRO the 7.5% and BPER Banca the 1.3%.

In November 2010, Fiat paid €122 million to buy back the last 5% stake owned by Mubadala Development. With this transaction, Fiat's stake in the luxury Italian car maker returned to 90%.

2014–2016 – The spin-off
In October 2014, Fiat Chrysler Automobiles (FCA) announced its intentions to separate Ferrari from the parent organisation; as of the announcement FCA owned 90% of Ferrari.

The separation began in October 2015 with a restructuring that established Ferrari N.V. as the new holding company of the Ferrari group and the subsequent sale by FCA of a 10% of the shares in an initial public offering (IPO) and concurrent listing of common shares on the New York Stock Exchange. Through the remainings steps of the separation, FCA's interest in Ferrari's business was distributed to shareholders of FCA, with a 10% continuing to be owned by Piero Ferrari.

On 3 January 2016, Fiat Chrysler Automobiles N.V. and Ferrari N.V. announced the completion of separation of the Ferrari business from the FCA group on the same day, with trading on the Mercato Telematico Azionario set to begin on 4 January 2016, under the RACE ticker symbol and the ISIN code NL0011585146.

2017 – Ferrari 70th anniversary

Ferrari celebrated the 70th anniversary of its foundation in 2017.

2019 – Scuderia Ferrari's 90th anniversary
Ferrari celebrated the 90th anniversary of its Scuderia.

2022 – Ferrari 75th anniversary
Ferrari celebrated the 75th anniversary of its foundation in 2022 with the Ferrari Daytona SP3 and a special livery at the 2022 Italian Grand Prix.

See also
 Museo Ferrari
 Museo Casa Enzo Ferrari

References 

Ferrari
Ferrari
Ferrari